Ahisamakh (lit. Brother of Support) is a moshav in central Israel. Located in the Shephelah, it falls under the jurisdiction of Hevel Modi'in Regional Council.

During the Ottoman period, the area of Ahisamakh belonged to the Nahiyeh (sub-district) of Lod that encompassed the area of the present-day city of Modi'in-Maccabim-Re'ut in the south to the present-day city of El'ad in the north, and from the foothills in the east, through the Lod Valley to the outskirts of Jaffa in the west. This area was home to thousands of inhabitants in about 20 villages, who had at their disposal tens of thousands of hectares of prime agricultural land.

The village was established in 1950 by refugees from Msallata in Libya. It is named after the Biblical Danite Ahisamakh" (Exodus 31:6)

References 

Moshavim
Populated places established in 1950
Populated places in Central District (Israel)
1950 establishments in Israel
Libyan-Jewish culture in Israel